Stein Motrøen (born 13 June 1973) is a retired Norwegian football midfielder.

He hails from Tynset and started his career in Tynset IF. In August 1994 he made his debut for Lyn, recording that one game, but played the majority of the games from 1995 to 1998, including 15 games in the 1997 Norwegian Premier League. For his next club Byåsen he was ever-present in the 1999 Norwegian First Division, before making a comeback in Tynset in 2000.

References

1973 births
Living people
Norwegian footballers
People from Tynset
Lyn Fotball players
Byåsen Toppfotball players
Eliteserien players
Norwegian First Division players
Association football midfielders
Sportspeople from Innlandet